This is a list of defunct airlines of Uganda.

See also
 List of airlines of Uganda
 List of airports in Uganda
 List of companies based in Uganda

References

Uganda
Airlines
Airlines, defunct